Liathach (pronounced) is a mountain in the Torridon Hills, in the Northwest Highlands of Scotland. It stands between Loch Torridon and the neighbouring mountain Beinn Eighe. The mountain is a ridge running east–west, with several peaks, and its upper half is made up of many steep rocky terraces.

Geology

The mountain is composed of Torridonian sandstone which forms massive near-horizontal strata. They form the numerous terraces that are obvious from afar. The rocks are mainly red and chocolate sandstones, arkoses, flagstones and shales with coarse conglomerates locally at the base. Some of the materials of these rocks were derived from the underlying Lewisian gneiss, upon the uneven surface of which they rest, but the bulk of the material was obtained from rocks that are nowhere now exposed. Upon this ancient denuded land surface the Torridonian strata rest horizontally or with gentle inclination. Some of the peaks, such as Beinn Eighe, are capped with white quartzite, giving them a distinctive appearance when seen from afar. Some of the quartzite contains fossilized worm burrows and is known as pipe rock. It is about 500 million years old. The Torridon landscape is itself highly denuded by glacial and alluvial action, and represents the remnants of an ancient peneplain.

Climbing

Liathach has four listed "Tops" in the Munro Tables, Meall Dearg at 3133 feet (955 m) stands off the main ridge at the end of the Northern Pinnacles which run north from Mullach an Rathain. The route along the Northern Pinnacles is considered a rock climb, although another route to the top from Coire na Caime only involves a short steep scramble on the final 50m to gain the ridge. Irvine Butterfield considers Meall Dearg "The most difficult top in the British Isles challenged only by the Inaccessible Pinnacle of Sgùrr Dearg".  The Northern Pinnacles were first climbed in 1894 by Hinxman, Rennie and Douglas.

Climbing the mountain including both of the above peaks is a challenging expedition; the intervening ridge is for the most part a series of rocky pinnacles known as Am Fasarinen (The Teeth), which reaches a height of 927 metres at the western end and is considered a Munro "top". There are few places on the ridge for descent, so once committed, the walker has little choice but to complete the entire ridge walk. The pinnacles can however be avoided by means of a narrow path that traverses the ridge on the south side. The path is very exposed, and there is much erosion at points where it crosses any of a series of gullies. In winter the traverse of Liathach becomes an even more serious expedition.

In popular culture
Scottish singer Jo Hamilton named a song after Liathach on her debut album Gown.  The song was subsequently covered by Prince on his 2013 Live Out Loud tour.

References 
 The Munros and Tops, Chris Townsend, 
 The High Mountains of Britain and Ireland, Irvine Butterfield, 
Footnotes

External links
 Liathach is at coordinates 

Munros
Marilyns of Scotland
Mountains and hills of the Northwest Highlands
Torridon
Climbing areas of Scotland
One-thousanders of Scotland